Claville is a commune in the Eure department in northern France.

Population

See also
Communes of the Eure department

References

External links 

  Unofficial website of Claville

Communes of Eure